Nawan Shehr is a town in Abbottabad District in Khyber Pakthunkhwa of Pakistan. Nawan Shehr's most famous place is Ilyasi Masjid which is the oldest and largest mosque of Abbottabad, there is also a small hill with walking tracks just behind the masjid. The weather is pleasant in summer, so people from other parts of country come to visit Abbottabad and Nawan Shehr. Board of Intermediate and Secondary Education of Abbottabad is also in Nawan Shehr. Nawan Shehr has its own old bazaar which is famous for its Chapli Kebab. The language spoken in Nawanshehr is Hindko. Gojri is also spoken in different parts.

Nawan Shehr is located on the way to Abbottabad City, the tourist resorts of Thandiani and Nathia Gali on Murree road at Location: 34°10'N 73°16'E
Altitude :

Tourist attractions
Nawanshehr features some of its own tourist attractions, such as:
Ilyasi Masjid (mosque) 
Bungalows (Locally known as Havelis) of Babu Sher Das.

In Nawanshehr there is a famous mosque that was built over a stream of water that flows from the mountain. The mosque stills stands to this day and still has water flowing underneath it. It is called Ilyasi Masjid. In front of it is a little pond-like area in which people can ride paddle-driven boats. The place is also famous for the 'Pakora' stalls.
Naray a natural spring which is used as a public bath.
Cricket Stadium

Notable people

 Mohammad Aslam Khan, senator from the Pakistan Peoples Party

References

Populated places in Abbottabad District